Phillip Douglas Norton (born February 1, 1976) is a former professional baseball pitcher. He played in the major leagues from - for the Chicago Cubs and the Cincinnati Reds.

On August 8, 2000, in just his second start at the Major League level Norton surrendered a Major League  record tying four home runs in one inning against the Los Angeles Dodgers. Norton, along with 37 other Major League pitchers, including Cy Young Award winners Randy Johnson, Zack Greinke, Justin Verlander, and John Smoltz were tied for the most home runs allowed in an inning until July 27, 2017, when Michael Blazek of the Milwaukee Brewers allowed 4 consecutive home-runs, followed by a pop out, and one more home run in the inning (for a record-breaking 5 HR's allowed), during his first ever Major League start.

Sources

1976 births
Living people
Arizona League Cubs players
Baseball players from Texas
Bridgeport Bluefish players
Chicago Cubs players
Cincinnati Reds players
Daytona Cubs players
Gulf Coast Cubs players
Iowa Cubs players
Lancaster Barnstormers players
Leones del Caracas players
American expatriate baseball players in Venezuela
Major League Baseball pitchers
Orlando Rays players
Rockford Cubbies players
Round Rock Express players
Somerset Patriots players
Texarkana Bulldogs baseball players
West Tennessee Diamond Jaxx players
Williamsport Cubs players